Thylacodes inopertus is a species of sea snail, a marine gastropod mollusk in the family Vermetidae, the worm snails or worm shells. This species was previously known as Serpulorbis inopertus.

Description

Distribution

References

External links

Vermetidae
Gastropods described in 1828